Jayson Omokaro Obazuaye (born July 27, 1984) is an American-Nigerian professional basketball guard.

Early life and high school career
Born in Santa Clara, California, Obazuaye graduated from Andrew Hill High School in nearby  San Jose, California in 2002. Obazuaye committed to the University of Colorado Boulder, having been recruited by local colleges Santa Clara and California, as well as Iowa State and Oklahoma.

College career
Obazuaye majored in ethnic studies and played four years for the Colorado Buffaloes men's basketball team from 2002 to 2006

Professional career
Obazuaye began his professional career in the 2006–07 season with Gipsar Stal Ostrów of the Polish Basketball League. He averaged 3.1 points and 1.1 rebounds in 10 games.

In the 2007–08 season, Obazuaye played for the Chester Jets of the British Basketball League. Obazuaye was the BBL's January 2008 Player of the Month and a 2nd-Team All-Star for the season.

In the 2008–09 season, Obazuaye played for the BBL's Milton Keynes Lions. He averaged 18.8 points and 4.0 rebounds in BBL Trophy games and 14.4 points and 4.0 rebounds in the playoff and championship rounds.

After two seasons with the BBL, Obazuaye played for Al-Ahli Benghazi of the Libyan Basketball League for the 2009–10 season. He averaged 20 points, 6 rebounds, and 4 assists. In the 2010–11 season, Obazuaye played for another Middle East team, Al-Wakrah of the Qatari Basketball League. In 2011–12, Obazuaye played for Smouha of Egyptian Basketball Super League.

Obazuaye returned to Al-Wakrah in the 2012–13 season for 8 games, averaging 14.6 points, 3.3 rebounds, and 5.5 assists. In 2013–14, Obazuaye played for Al-Jazeera of Libyan Basketball  League. In 2014–15, he played for Al-Karkh of Iraqi Division I Basketball League.

International career
He represented Nigeria at the 2007 African Championship and 2009 African Championship averaging 8.2 points, 3.8 rebounds and 2.8 assists per game

References

External links
 

1984 births
Living people
African Games bronze medalists for Nigeria
African Games gold medalists for Nigeria
African Games medalists in basketball
American expatriate basketball people in Egypt
American expatriate basketball people in Poland
American expatriate basketball people in Qatar
American expatriate basketball people in the United Kingdom
American men's basketball players
American sportspeople of Nigerian descent
Basketball players from San Jose, California
Cheshire Jets players
Colorado Buffaloes men's basketball players
Competitors at the 2007 All-Africa Games
London Lions (basketball) players
Nigerian expatriates in Egypt
Nigerian expatriates in Libya
Nigerian expatriates in Qatar
Nigerian expatriates in the United Kingdom
Nigerian men's basketball players
Shooting guards
Sportspeople from Santa Clara, California